Tolon Senior High School is a second-cycle institution in Tolon in the Northern Region of Ghana. Currently, Mohammed Issifu is the headmaster of the school.

History 
The school was first built as a day school in 1991. In 2019, the school has about 2,343 students.

References 

1991 establishments in Ghana
High schools in Ghana